Robert Pack (1786 in Dorset, England – 1860 in Carbonear, Newfoundland) was a merchant, politician and justice of the peace was elected to the Newfoundland House of Assembly representing the district of Conception Bay on the first general election held in Newfoundland in 1832.

See also
 List of people of Newfoundland and Labrador

External links
Biography at the Dictionary of Canadian Biography Online

1786 births
1860 deaths
Members of the Newfoundland and Labrador House of Assembly
People from Carbonear
English emigrants to pre-Confederation Newfoundland
Newfoundland Colony people